Terry Michael Teagle (born April 10, 1960) is a retired American professional basketball player, whose National Basketball Association (NBA) career lasted from 1982 to 1993. During his playing career, at a height of 6'5" (1.96 m) tall, he played at the shooting guard position.

High school
Teagle attended Broaddus High School, in Broaddus, Texas, where he also played high school basketball.

College career
After high school, Teagle attended Baylor University, where he played college basketball with the Baylor Bears, from 1978 to 1982. Teagle began his college career as fellow Bear Vinnie Johnson was winding his up. During his college career, he was a three time All-Southwest Conference First Team selection, (1980, 1981, 1982), the Southwest Conference Player of the Year (1980), and an All-American Second Team selection, in 1982.

Professional career

NBA
Teagle was selected 16th overall, in the 1982 NBA draft, by the Houston Rockets. He lasted two seasons in Houston (1982–84), before moving on to play with the Detroit Pistons (1984–85), Golden State Warriors (1984–90), and Los Angeles Lakers (1990–92), before returning to the Rockets to play two games in April 1993. On April 15, 1991, Teagle scored a basket against the Dallas Mavericks after catching a pass from Laker teammate Earvin "Magic" Johnson, giving Johnson his 9,888th career assist to pass Oscar Robertson as the NBA's all-time leader in career assists at the time.  Teagle played in 732 games in the NBA (regular season and playoffs combined), with career averages of 11.6 points, 2.6 rebounds, and 1.4 assists per game.

Europe
During the 1992–93 FIBA EuroLeague season, Teagle signed a one-year contract with Benetton Treviso of the Italian league. He reached the EuroLeague Finals with the club, while playing alongside teammate Toni Kukoč. He averaged 19.7 points, 5.6 rebounds, and 1.2 assists per game, during EuroLeague play. Treviso eventually lost in the EuroLeague Finals to the French club Limoges CSP, by a score of 59–55, with Teagle scoring 19 points and grabbing 4 rebounds. He was the top scorer of the Finals.

References

External links
NBA.com Profile 
Basketball-Reference.com Profile
FIBA EuroLeague Profile
Italian League Profile 

1960 births
Living people
African-American basketball players
All-American college men's basketball players
American expatriate basketball people in Argentina
American expatriate basketball people in Italy
Atenas basketball players
Basketball players from Texas
Baylor Bears men's basketball players
Houston Rockets draft picks
Houston Rockets players
Detroit Pistons players
Detroit Spirits players
Golden State Warriors players
Los Angeles Lakers players
Pallacanestro Treviso players
People from San Augustine County, Texas
Shooting guards
American men's basketball players
21st-century African-American people
20th-century African-American sportspeople